Kolb (also called Kolb's Corner) is an unincorporated community located in the town of Ledgeview, Brown County, Wisconsin, United States. The community is named after Peter Kolb, who was the first postmaster when the post office opened in May 1887.

References

Unincorporated communities in Brown County, Wisconsin
Unincorporated communities in Wisconsin
Green Bay metropolitan area